European Theological Seminary (ETS) is a private, faith-based, accredited, graduate school located in Kniebis (Freudenstadt), Germany. It is part of the educational ministry of the Church of God.

History

European Theological Seminary was founded in 1949 through the initiation of Church of God World Missions. The seminary has undergone several name changes in its history. It began in 1958 as the German Church of God Bible School in Krehwinkel.  The name was changed to the International Bible Seminary (I.B.S.) in 1964, and then became the European Bible Seminary in 1972. In autumn of 2002, the European Bible Seminary relocated to Freudenstadt-Kniebis and with this change of location, the school also changed its name to European Theological Seminary (ETS).

References

External links

Church of God Dept of Education Webpage

Seminaries and theological colleges in Germany
Universities and colleges affiliated with the Church of God (Cleveland, Tennessee)
Universities in Germany
Freudenstadt (district)